Oteramika is a locality in the Southland region of New Zealand's South Island.  It is in a rural setting near Waituna and Woodlands to the north, Rimu to the west, and to the south on the Southern Scenic Route are Mokotua, Kapuka, and Ashers.  The major centre of Southland, Invercargill, is over 15 km west.

No railway was ever built through Oteramika, but at one point, the Kapuka railway station on the Tokanui Branch was named Oteramika.  This station opened on 1 March 1895, closed to passengers on 1 June 1960, and closed to all traffic on 31 March 1966.

References

Populated places in Southland, New Zealand